The 2021 24 Hours of Spa (also known as the TotalEnergies 24 Hours of Spa for sponsorship reasons) was the 73rd running of the 24 Hours of Spa. It took place from 29 July–1 August 2021. The race was part of both the 2021 GT World Challenge Europe Endurance Cup and the 2021 Intercontinental GT Challenge.

Background
After being delayed the previous year to October due to the COVID-19 pandemic in Belgium, the race returned to its traditional end of July date for 2021. Spectators were allowed for the race, but were restricted to two bubbles and were required to wear a mask at all times. Initial plans also would have required spectators to provide proof of vaccination or a negative test result for the COVID-19 virus, but this was scrapped days before the event.

Supporting the race weekend were the GT4 European Series, Lamborghini Super Trofeo, TCR Europe Championship, Renault Clio Cup Europe, and a new TC France series. 

Prior to the race, Frikadelli Racing was forced to withdraw due to the impacts of the 2021 European floods. Their spot was taken over by Schnabl Engineering.

Entry list

Results

Race
Class winners denoted in bold and with 

 
 indicates car was classified, but not running at the finish.

References

|- style="text-align:center"
|width="35%"|Previous race:2020 Kyalami 9 Hours
|width="30%"|Intercontinental GT Challenge2021 season
|width="35%"|Next race:2021 Indianapolis 8 Hours
|- style="text-align:center"
|width="35%"|Previous race:2021 Paul Ricard 1000km
|width="30%"|GT World Challenge Europe Endurance Cup2021 season
|width="35%"|Next race:2021 3 Hours of Nürburgring
|- style="text-align:center"

2021
2021 in Belgian motorsport
July 2021 sports events in Belgium
August 2021 sports events in Belgium
2021 GT World Challenge Europe
2021 GT World Challenge Europe Endurance Cup
|}